Royan Institute is an Iranian clinical research and educational institute dedicated to biomedical, translational and clinical research, stem cell research, and infertility treatment. It is a public non-profitable organization affiliated to Academic Center for Education, Culture, and Research. It was established in 1991 by the late Dr. Saeid Kazemi Ashtiani as a research institute for Reproductive Biomedicine and infertility treatments. In 1998 this institute was approved by the Ministry of Health as Cell-Based Research Center with over 46 scientific members and 186 lab technicians. Iran ranks second in the list of countries where stem cell research is popular.

history 
Stem cell research in Iran began on a high note after the leader Ali Khamenei Emphasized on  this type of research in 2002. Unlike the United States, which has discussed using human embryos in stem cell research, Iran has not encountered such obstacles. Iran has been able to make great progress in the 14 years of its research activity in this field.

Research institutes
Royan consists of three research institutes, each focused on different fields of research:
 Royan Institute for Stem Cell Biology and Technology (RI-SCBT)
 Royan Institute for Reproductive Biomedicine (RI-RB)
 Royan Institute for Developmental Biotechnology (RI-AB)

The institute has had close collaborations with other leading Iranian research centers such as Institute of Biochemistry and Biophysics (IBB), NRCGEB, and the Hematology-Oncology and Stem Cell Transplantation Research Center at Shariati Hospital in Tehran.

Royan publishes the Cell Journal with an impact factor of 3.128 (2022).

Royan Institute for Stem Cell Biology and Technology 

Royan Institute for Stem Cell Biology and Technology (RI-SCBT) first, as the "Department of Stem Cells," was established in 2002 to advance research on biology and technology of embryonic stem cells, induced pluripotent stem cells, germ line stem cells, adult stem cells, cancer stem cells, and cord blood stem cells.

The institute provides a comprehensive and coordinated "bench to bedside" approach to regenerative medicine, including a greater understanding of the fundamental biology of stem cells, developmental biology, tissue engineering programs, the development of translational research of stem cell therapeutics, and administration of new cell therapies approach that can restore tissue function to patients.

The RI-SCBT comprises four departments including the Department of stem cells and developmental biology, the Department of cell engineering, the Department of regenerative medicine, and the Department of brain and cognitive sciences.

Iran has some of the most liberal laws on stem cell research in the world. The institute founded a Department of Stem Cells in 2002 to establish human embryonic stem cell lines and Induced Pluripotent Stem Cell (iPSC), and to study differentiation into different kinds of cells including cardiomyocytes, beta cells, and neural cells. Researchers claimed a live birth of a cloned sheep in 2006, inviting foreign observers to verify the claim.

Royan Institute for Reproductive Biomedicine 
Royan Institute for Reproductive Biomedicine (RI-RB), founded in 1991, consists of six departments and one clinic actively working on different aspects of infertility and the development of new methods for infertility treatment.

It aims to improve the population's health through infertility treatments and research different aspects of infertility and its treatment to increase the success rate alongside improving embryo health.
 Reproductive Imaging
 Epidemiology & Reproductive Health
 Andrology
 Reproductive Genetics
 Endocrinology & Female Infertility
 Embryology

Royan Institute for Developmental Biotechnology

Developmental Biotechnology (RI-DB) was initially established in 2004 as a research sub-institute that is located in Isfahan Province. The endeavors of RI-DB have made Royan Institute the pioneer of animal cloning in Iran and the Middle East. Coming up with the first cloned sheep in the Middle East in 2006 placed Iran among the few countries having this technology. Making use of this technology in producing transgenic animals has led to bringing the goats into being in Isfahan and Tehran (2009) with the ability to secrete human coagulation factor 9 and human Tissue Plasminogen Activator (hTPA) in their milk.
 
The vision of RI-DB is to achieve high standards in biotechnology research and to make biotechnology a premier precision tool for future health development.
 
RI-DB includes the Animal Biotechnology department, three research groups, and four laboratories.

Chronological overview 
 1993: The first IVF birth in Tehran
 1995: The second ICSI birth in Iran
 1996: Iran's second success in open testicular biopsy to treat severe male infertility
 1996: The first frozen embryo birth in Iran
 1999: The first ICSI birth by frozen sperm of a gonadectomized man
 1999: The first celebration of the 1000th birth through assisted conception treatment in Iran
 2003: The first human embryonic Stem Cell line establishment in Iran and the region
 2003: Establishment of Stem Cells research department
 2004: The first PGD child born in Iran
 2004: The first time use of adult stem cells in the treatment of MI during CABG in Iran
 2004: Production of insulin-producing cells from human embryonic stem cells.
 2004: Culture of Human Limbal Stem Cells on Chorionic Membrane and use them for corneal injuries
 2005: Establishment of the first Private Cord Blood Bank in Iran (Royan Stem Cell Technology Co.)
 2006: The first IVM-IVF sheep born in Iran
 2006: Iran's first cloned sheep, named Royana.
 2006: The first nuclear transferred, in vitro fertilized sheep born
 2007: Culture and transplantation of fibroblasts

 2008: Establishment of mouse and human induced pluripotent stem cells (iPS)
 2008: Transplantation of melanocytes for the patient with vitiligo
 2009: The first cloned goat was born in Iran.
 2010: The first transgenic goats born in Irans
 2011: The first calves born from vitrified in vitro developed embryos in Iran
 2011: Establishment of cell therapy pre-hospital
 2011: Establishmentof Stem Cell Bank
 2012: The first healthy childbirth after Molecular PGD for beta-thalassemia in Iran
 2013: Birth of eight cloned goats through the simplified method of SCNT in Iran
 2015: Birth of a cloned Isfahan mouflon to a surrogate domestic sheep.
 2016: The first knock-in mice produced with CRISPR technology in Iran. 
 2017: The first transgenic zebrafish disease models in Iran. 
 2017: The first cryopreserved human ovarian tissue auto-transplantation in cancer patients. 
 2018: Establishment of the Faculty of Basic Sciences and Medical Technology in Royan Institute
 2018: Establishment of the Advanced Therapy Medicinal Product Technology Development Center (ATMP) 
 2019: Obtaining the license to produce Kimia-cell in GMP conditions in Royan – ATMP Center from Iran FDA 
 2020: Producing the transgene Covid mouse for pre-clinical studies of Covid-19 vaccines   
 2020: Receiving the international ISO certificate; ISO 9001:2015 for Laboratory Animal Science Core Facility 
 2021: Implementing the phase I clinical trial for Natural Killer cell therapy for pediatric glioblastoma   
 2022: Commercialization of human gamete and embryo freeze-thaw media

Prominent achievements 
 Report of three new mutations of cystic fibrosis
 Best paper selection in MEFS congress 2004
 Best young researcher in Razi medical science award 2004
 Report of human embryonic stem cells’ proteomics for the first time in the world
 Registration of one human embryonic stem cell line in the International Society of Stem Cell Research
 Establishment of 6 human embryonic stem cell lines
 Establishment of 8 mouse embryonic stem cell lines which three of them can be donated to the centers or researchers for one time
 Introduction of late director of Royan Institute as Iran's everlasting legend in 2005
 Best poster award in Stem Cell congress, India, 2005
 Selection as “prominent research center” in Razi medical sciences award
 Best researcher in Razi medical sciences award 2006
 Best medical journal (Cell Journal (yakhteh) ) in Razi medical sciences award 2006
 Best research achievement prize in Razi medical sciences award
 Best research achievement prize in Kharazmi young researcher award 2006
 Best research prize in second international reproduction student award, Yazd, Iran, 2007
 Report of Mesenchymal stem cells’ new surface markers to the world
 Publication of more than 3000 papers in local and international journals
 Performance of 341 research projects and follow of 225 undergoing projects
 Presentation of 997 papers in national and international congresses
 Publication of two journals: Cell Journal(Yakhteh) and IJFS (Iranian Journal of Fertility and Sterility), Indexed in ISI
 Editorial board of four internationals
 six chapters of international textbooks in stem cell fields
 Publication of more than 100 books
 Performance of more than 56 inter-center and multi-center research nationally or internationally
 Use of adult stem cells in corneal injuries and myocardial infarction on human
 Transplantation of stem cells to the animal model of diseases in hepatic cirrhosis, spinal cord injuries, bone defects, cartilage damage, and diabetes
 Several research achievements in preimplantation diagnosis and screening
 Producing iPS cell line, Royan H7
 Registration of T338A, K536X, Y122H genes in CBAVD (Congenital Bilateral Absence of Vas Deferens) patients, 2007

Honors 

 2004: Honoring the Everlasting Personage Prize 
 2009:	Being selected by Iran National Award for the Book of the Year 
 2010:	Receiving The Islamic Educational, Scientific, and Cultural Organization “ISESCO”- Science and Technology Prize
 2012:	Earning the scientific Hippocrates Prize 
 2014:	Winning the UNESCO Prize
 2014:	Winning Allameh Tabatabaei Award hosted by Iran vice Presidency for Science and Technology, Presidency and National Elite Foundation
 2019:	Earning The World Academy of Science “TWAS” Prize
 2019:	Gaining the 32nd Khawrizmi Award
 2019:	Receiving the Mustafa Prize
 2020:	Placing as one of the top ten research institutes worldwide during the last two decades according to the total number of publications in the field of male infertility and assisted reproductive techniques (ART)
 2021:	Receiving the Health Service Medal from Tehran Municipality, Health Section
 2022:	Achieving second place among 52 Iranian Research Institutes
 2022:	Winning Dayong Gao Young Investigator Award Cryobiology Society
	Receiving several Razi Research Awards on Medical Science hosted by the Iran Ministry of Health and Medical Education

See also
Avicenna Research Institute
California Institute for Regenerative Medicine
Health care in Iran
Cell Journal
International Journal of Fertility and Sterility
Cell Tech Pharmed
Royan Institute Award
Royan Congress
kazemi prize
Dr. Saeid Kazemi Ashtiani
Hossein Baharvand
Mohamadreza Baghaban Eslaminejad
Stem cell
Stem cell laws and policy in Iran

Notes

External links

Medical research institutes in Iran
Stem cell research